Langenfelde railway station is on the Altona–Kiel and the Altona–Neumünster lines and is served by the city trains and the commuter trains of the AKN railways plc. The station is named after the Langenfelde suburb. It is located in the Stellingen quarter in the Hamburg borough of Eimsbüttel, Germany. The station is managed by the DB Station&Service plc. for the public transport operator of Hamburg (Hamburger Verkehrsverbund (HVV)).

History  
After 1879, when Nothnagel & Co. promoted the idea to build a railway line to transport peat to Altona, the Altona Kaltenkirchen Railway Company was founded, today's Altona Kaltenkirchen Neumünster Railway Company and in 1883 works started for the Hamburg-Altona–Neumünster railway line. On 8 September 1884 passenger traffic was opened. However, between 1911 and 1912, when the line at grade was elevated onto a railway embankment in order to stop hindrances by level crossings, Langenfelde was given up as a stop. With AKN ceding the section of the Altona-Neumünster line between Altona and Eidelstedt to the Deutsche Bundesbahn the latter redeveloped the stations in this section into S-Bahn stations, and reopened Langenfelde station in 1962.

Station layout
The station is an elevated island platform with two tracks and one exit. A lift was added recently.

Station services

Trains
The rapid transit trains of the Hamburg S-Bahn lines S3 and S21 call at the station. The commuter trains of the AKN line A1 call at Langenfelde only once a day Monday to Friday at 9.06 am, and only one way to Central Station.

Direction of the trains on track 1 is northbound toward Kaltenkirchen and Neumünster (A1), Elbgaustraße (S21), and Pinneberg (S3). On track 2 the trains run southbound in the direction Hamburg central station via Holstenstraße (A1), Stade via Altona (S3), and Aumühle via Holstenstraße (S21).

Facilities at the station
A small shop in the station sells fast food and newspapers. Another shop sells bakery products, as well as Turkish take away food. There are no lockerboxes. Expectedly in course of April 2011 a newly installed lift will provide full access also for handicapped people. No personnel are attending the station, but there are SOS and information telephones, ticket machines and bicycle stands.

References

External links

 DB station information 
 Line and route network plans at hvv.de 

Hamburg S-Bahn stations in Hamburg
Buildings and structures in Eimsbüttel
Railway stations in Germany opened in 1884